Marquel Fleetwood (born January 23, 1970) is a former American football quarterback who played four seasons in the Canadian Football League with the Ottawa Rough Riders, Toronto Argonauts and Hamilton Tiger-Cats. He played college football at the University of Minnesota. He was also a member of the Frankfurt Galaxy of the World League of American Football.

Professional career

Ottawa Rough Riders
Fleetwood signed with the Ottawa Rough Riders in April 1993, spending two seasons as a backup quarterback with the Rough Riders. He was released in May 1995.

Toronto Argonauts
Fleetwood was signed by the Toronto Argonauts in May 1996. He was released by the Argonaut in May 1997.

BC Lions
Fleetwood signed with the BC Lions in  June 1997. He retired before the start of the season.

Hamilton Tiger-Cats
Fleetwood came out of retirement to play for the Hamilton Tiger-Cats in October 1997.

References

External links
Just Sports Stats
College stats
Fanbase profile

Living people
1970 births
Players of American football from Atlanta
American football quarterbacks
Canadian football quarterbacks
African-American players of American football
African-American players of Canadian football
Minnesota Golden Gophers football players
Ottawa Rough Riders players
Frankfurt Galaxy players
Toronto Argonauts players
Hamilton Tiger-Cats players
21st-century African-American sportspeople
20th-century African-American sportspeople